Sybra signatipennis is a species of beetle in the family Cerambycidae. It was described by Fisher in 1927.

References

signatipennis
Beetles described in 1927